, or more specifically , are colored varieties of the Amur carp (Cyprinus rubrofuscus) that are kept for decorative purposes in outdoor koi ponds or water gardens.

Koi is an informal name for the colored variants of C. rubrofuscus kept for ornamental purposes. There are many varieties of ornamental koi, originating from breeding that began in Niigata, Japan in the early 19th century. Several varieties are recognized by the Japanese, distinguished by coloration, patterning, and scalation. Some of the major colors are white, black, red, orange, yellow, blue, brown and cream, besides metallic shades like gold and silver-white ('platinum') scales. The most popular category of koi is the Gosanke, which is made up of the Kōhaku, Taishō Sanshoku and Shōwa Sanshoku varieties.

History 
Carp are a large group of fish originally found in Central Europe and Asia. Various carp species were originally domesticated in China, where they were used as food fish. Carp are coldwater fish, and their ability to survive and adapt to many climates and water conditions allowed the domesticated species to be propagated to many new locations, including Japan. Natural color mutations of these carp would have occurred across all populations. Chinese Jin Dynasty (fourth century AD) texts mentioned carp of various colors. The oldest mention of colored carp in Japan is found in the Japanese history book Nihon Shoki (Chronicles of Japan) completed in 720. According to the Nihon shoki, it is recorded that Emperor Keikō praised colored carp in a pond in the Mino region in 94 and that Emperor Suiko saw them in the garden of Soga no Umako's residence in 620. Carp were first bred for color mutations in China more than a thousand years ago, where selective breeding of colored varieties led to the development of the goldfish (Carassius auratus).

The Amur carp (Cyprinus rubrofuscus) is a member of the cyprinid family species complex native to East Asia. Amur carp were previously identified as a subspecies of the common carp (as C. c. haematopterus), but recent authorities treat it as a separate species under the name C. rubrofuscus. Amur carp have been aquacultured as a food fish at least as long ago as the fifth century BC in China. The systematic breeding of ornamental Amur carp began in the 1820s, in Ojiya and Yamakoshi in the Niigata Prefecture (located on the northeastern coast of Honshu) in Japan. Selective breeding gave rise first to red carp, then to pale blue Asagi and white, red, and yellow Bekkou. The Sarasa variety, with a red on white  pattern, was created around 1830. Later, a yellow-based Ki utsuri variety was born. From this original handful of koi varieties, all other Nishikigoi varieties were bred, with the exception of the Ogon variety (single-colored, metallic koi), which was developed relatively recently.

The outside world was unaware of the development of color variations in Japanese koi until 1914 when the Niigata koi were exhibited at an annual exposition in Tokyo. From that time, interest in koi spread throughout Japan. The number of varieties continued to grow, and repeated cross-breeding gave rise to more flashy varieties, such as Kōhaku, Taishō Sanshoku and Shōwa Sanshoku.

The hobby of keeping koi eventually spread worldwide. They are sold in many pet aquarium shops, with higher-quality fish available from specialist dealers. Collecting koi has become a social hobby. Passionate hobbyists join clubs, share their knowledge and help each other with their koi. In particular, since the 21st century, some wealthy Chinese have imported large quantities of koi from Niigata in Japan, and the price of high-quality carp has soared. In 2018, one carp was bought by a Chinese collector for about $2 million, the highest price ever. There are also cases in which purchased carp are bred in China and sold to foreign countries, and many breeds are spreading all over the world.

Etymology 

The words "koi" and "nishikigoi" come from the Japanese words 鯉 (carp), and 錦鯉 (brocaded carp), respectively. In Japanese, "koi" is a homophone for 恋, another word that means "affection" or "love", so koi are symbols of love and friendship in Japan.

Colored ornamental carp were originally called Irokoi (色鯉) meaning colored carp, Hanakoi (花鯉) meaning floral carp, and Moyōkoi (模様鯉) meaning patterned carp. There are various theories as to how these words came to be disused, in favor of Nishikigoi (錦鯉), which is used today. One theory holds that, during World War II, the words Irokoi and Hanakoi (which can have sexual meanings) were changed to Nishikigoi because they were not suitable for the social situation of war. Another theory is that Nishikigoi, which was the original name for the popular Taishō Sanshoku variety, gradually became the term used for all ornamental koi.

Taxonomy 
In the past,  koi were  commonly believed to have been bred from the common carp (Cyprinus carpio). Extensive hybridization between different populations, coupled with widespread translocations, has muddled the historical zoogeography of the common carp and its relatives. Traditionally, Amur carp (C. rubrofuscus) were considered a subspecies of the common carp, often under the scientific name C. carpio haematopterus. However, they differ in meristics from the common carp of Europe and Western Asia, leading recent authorities to recognize them as a separate species, C. rubrofuscus (C. c. haematopterus being a junior synonym). Although one study of mitochondrial DNA  (mtDNA) was unable to find a clear genetic structure matching the geographic populations (possibly because of translocation of carp from separate regions), others based on mtDNA, microsatellite DNA and genomic DNA found a clear separation between the European/West Asian population and the East Asian population, with koi belonging in the latter. Consequently, recent authorities have suggested that the ancestral species of the koi is C. rubrofuscus (syn. C. c. haematopterus) or at least an East Asian carp species instead of C. carpio. Regardless, a taxonomic review of Cyprinus carp from eastern and southeastern Asia may be necessary, as the genetic variations do not fully match the currently recognized species pattern, with one study of mtDNA suggesting that koi are close to the Southeast Asian carp, but not necessarily the Chinese.

Varieties 

According to Zen Nippon Airinkai, a group that leads the breeding and dissemination of koi in Japan, there are more than 100 varieties of koi created through breeding, and each variety is classified into 16 groups. Koi varieties are distinguished by coloration, patterning, and scalation. Some of the major colors are white, black, red, yellow, blue, and cream. Metallic shades of gold and platinum in the scales have also been developed through selective breeding. Although the possible colors are virtually limitless, breeders have identified and named a number of specific categories.

New koi varieties are still being actively developed. Ghost koi developed in the 1980s have become very popular in the United Kingdom; they are a hybrid of wild carp and Ogon koi and are distinguished by their metallic scales. Butterfly koi (also known as longfin koi, or dragon carp), also developed in the 1980s, are notable for their long and flowing fins. They are hybrids of koi with Asian carp. Butterfly koi and ghost koi are considered by some to be not true nishikigoi.

The major named varieties include:

  is a white-skinned koi, with large red markings on the top. The name means "red and white"; kōhaku was the one of the first ornamental variety to be established in Japan (late 19th century).
  is very similar to the kōhaku, except for the addition of small black markings called . This variety was first exhibited in 1914 by the koi breeder Gonzo Hiroi, during the reign of the Taishō Emperor. In the United States, the name is often abbreviated to just "Sanke". The kanji, 三色, may be read as either sanshoku or as sanke (from its earlier name 三毛).
  is a black koi with red (hi 緋) and white (shiroji 白地) markings. The first Shōwa Sanke was exhibited in 1927, during the reign of the Shōwa Emperor. In America, the name is often abbreviated to just "Shōwa". The amount of shiroji on Shōwa Sanke has increased in modern times (Kindai Shōwa 近代昭和), to the point that it can be difficult to distinguish from Taishō Sanke. The kanji, 三色, may be read as either sanshoku or as sanke.
  is a white-, red-, or yellow-skinned koi with black markings . The Japanese name means "tortoise shell", and is commonly written as 鼈甲. It may be confused with the Utsuri.
  is a black koi with white, red, or yellow markings, in a zebra color pattern. The oldest attested form is the yellow form, called  in the 19th century, but renamed  by Elizaburo Hoshino, an early 20th-century koi breeder. The word utsuri means to print (the black markings are reminiscent of ink stains). Genetically, it is the same as Shōwa, but lacking either red pigment (Shiro Utsuri) or white pigment (Hi Utsuri/Ki Utsuri).
  koi is light blue above and usually red below, but also occasionally pale yellow or cream, generally below the lateral line and on the cheeks. The Japanese name means pale greenish-blue, spring onion color, or indigo.
 ' means "autumn green"; the Shūsui was created in 1910 by Yoshigoro Akiyama（秋山　吉五郎, by crossing Japanese Asagi with German mirror carp. The fish has no scales, except for a single line of large mirror scales dorsally, extending from head to tail. The most common type of Shūsui has a pale, sky-blue/gray color above the lateral line and red or orange (and very, very rarely bright yellow) below the lateral line and on the cheeks.
  is a white fish with a Kōhaku-style pattern with blue or black-edged scales only over the hi pattern. This variety first arose in the 1950s as a cross between a Kōhaku and an Asagi.
  is a "catch-all" term for koi that cannot be put into one of the other categories. This is a competition category, and many new varieties of koi compete in this one category.
  is a dark koi with red (Kōhaku style) hi pattern. The Japanese name means "five colors". It appears similar to an Asagi, with little or no hi below the lateral line and a Kōhaku Hi pattern over reticulated (fishnet pattern) scales. The base color can range from nearly black to very pale, sky blue.
  is a variety of which the whole body is one color and the body is shiny, and it is called differently depending on the color.
  is a koi with colored markings over a metallic base or in two metallic colors.
  is a cross between utsurimono series and Ōgon.
  is a koi with metallic (glittering, metal-flake-appearing) scales. The name translates into English as "gold and silver scales"; it is often abbreviated to Ginrin. Ginrin versions of almost all other varieties of koi occur, and they are fashionable. Their sparkling, glittering scales contrast to the smooth, even, metallic skin and scales seen in the Ogon varieties. Recently, these characteristics have been combined to create the new ginrin Ogon varieties.
  is any koi with a solitary red patch on its head. The fish may be a Tanchō Shōwa, Tanchō Sanke, or even Tanchō Goshiki. It is named for the Japanese red-crowned crane (Grus japonensis), which also has a red spot on its head.
 , "tea-colored", this koi can range in color from pale olive-drab green or brown to copper or bronze and more recently, darker, subdued orange shades. Famous for its docile, friendly personality and large size, it is considered a sign of good luck among koi keepers.
  is a metallic koi of one color only (hikarimono 光者). The most commonly encountered colors are gold, platinum, and orange. Cream specimens are very rare.  Ogon compete in the Kawarimono category and the Japanese name means "gold".  The variety was created by Sawata Aoki in 1946 from wild carp he caught in 1921. 
 ' （literally "nine tattooed dragons" is a black doitsu-scaled fish with curling white markings. The patterns are thought to be reminiscent of Japanese ink paintings of dragons. They famously change color with the seasons. Kumonryu compete in the Kawarimono category.
  is a light blue/gray koi with copper, bronze, or yellow (Kohaku-style) pattern, reminiscent of autumn leaves on water. The Japanese name means "fallen leaves".
 Kikokuryū (輝黒竜, literally "sparkle" or "glitter black dragon") is a metallic-skinned version of the Kumonryu.
 Kin-Kikokuryū (金輝黒竜, literally "gold sparkle black dragon" or "gold glitter black dragon") is a metallic-skinned version of the Kumonryu with a Kōhaku-style hi pattern developed by Mr. Seiki Igarashi of Ojiya City. At least six different genetic subvarieties of this general variety are seen.
 Ghost koi (人面魚、じんめんぎょ), a hybrid of Ogon and wild carp with metallic scales, is considered by some to be not nishikigoi.
 Butterfly koi (鰭長錦鯉、ひれながにしきごい) is a hybrid of koi and Asian carp with long flowing fins. Various colorations depend on the koi stock used to cross. It also is considered by some to not be nishikigoi.
  originated by crossbreeding numerous different established varieties with "scaleless" German carp (generally, fish with only a single line of scales along each side of the dorsal fin). Also written as 独逸鯉, four main types of Doitsu scale patterns exist. The most common type (referred to above) has a row of scales beginning at the front of the dorsal fin and ending at the end of the dorsal fin (along both sides of the fin). The second type has a row of scales beginning where the head meets the shoulder and running the entire length of the fish (along both sides). The third type is the same as the second, with the addition of a line of (often quite large) scales running along the lateral line (along the side) of the fish, also referred to as "mirror koi". The fourth (and rarest) type is referred to as "armor koi" and is completely (or nearly) covered with very large scales that resemble plates of armor. It also is called Kagami-goi (鏡鯉、カガミゴイ), or mirror carp (ミラーカープ).

Differences from goldfish 

Goldfish (Carassius auratus) were developed in China more than a thousand years ago by selectively breeding colored varieties; by the Song dynasty (960–1279), yellow, orange, white, and red-and-white colorations had been developed. Goldfish were introduced to Japan in the 16th century and to Europe in the 17th century. On the other hand, most ornamental koi breeds currently distributed worldwide originate from Amur carp (Cyprinus rubrofuscus) bred in Japan in the first half of the 19th century. Koi are domesticated Amur carp that are selected or culled for color; they are not a different species, and will revert to the original coloration within a few generations if allowed to breed freely.

Some goldfish varieties, such as the common goldfish, comet goldfish, and shubunkin, have body shapes and coloration that are similar to koi, and can be difficult to tell apart from koi when immature. Goldfish and koi can interbreed; however, as they were developed from different species of carp, their offspring are sterile.

Health, maintenance, and longevity 

The Amur carp is a hardy fish, and koi retain that durability. Specific pond construction has been evolved by koi keepers intent on raising show-quality koi.

The bright colors of koi put them at a severe disadvantage against predators; a white-skinned Kōhaku is a visual dinner bell against the dark green of a pond. Herons, kingfishers, otters, raccoons, skunk, mink, cats, foxes, and badgers are all capable of emptying a pond of its fish. A well-designed outdoor pond has areas too deep for herons to stand, overhangs high enough above the water that mammals cannot reach in, and shade trees overhead to block the view of aerial passers-by. It may prove necessary to string nets or wires above the surface. A pond usually includes a pump and filtration system to keep the water clear.

Koi are an omnivorous fish. They eat a wide variety of foods, including peas, lettuce, and watermelon. Koi food is designed not only to be nutritionally balanced, but also to float so as to encourage them to come to the surface. When they are eating,  koi can be checked for parasites and ulcers. Naturally, koi are bottom feeders with a mouth configuration adapted for that. Some koi have a tendency to eat mostly from the bottom, so food producers create a mixed sinking and floating combination food. Koi recognize the persons feeding them and gather around them at feeding times. They can be trained to take food from one's hand. In the winter, their digestive systems slow nearly to a halt, and they eat very little, perhaps no more than nibbles of algae from the bottom. Feeding is not recommended when the water temperature drops below . Care should be taken by hobbyists that proper oxygenation, pH stabilization, and off-gassing occur over the winter in small ponds, so they do not perish. Their appetites do not come back until the water becomes warm in the spring.

Koi have been reported to achieve ages of 100–200 years. One famous scarlet koi named "Hanako" was owned by several individuals, the last of whom was Komei Koshihara. In July 1974, a study of the growth rings of one of the koi's scales reported that Hanako was 226 years old. Some sources give an accepted age for the species at little more than 50 years.

Disease 
Koi are very hardy. With proper care, they resist many of the parasites that affect more sensitive tropical fish species, such as Trichodina, Epistylis, and Ichthyophthirius multifiliis infections. Water pH is important for maintaining koi's health. Water changes help reduce the risk of diseases and keep koi from being stressed. Two of the biggest health concerns among koi breeders are the koi herpes virus (KHV) and rhabdovirus carpio, which causes spring viraemia of carp (SVC). No treatment is known for either disease. Some koi farms in Israel use the KV3 vaccine, developed by Prof. M. Kotler from the Hebrew University of Jerusalem and produced by Kovax, to immunise fish against KHV. Israel is currently the only country in the world to vaccinate koi against the KHV. The vaccine is injected into the fish when they are under one year old, and is accentuated by using an ultraviolet light. The vaccine has a 90% success rate and when immunized, the fish cannot succumb to a KHV outbreak and neither can the immunised koi pass KHV onto other fish in a pond. Only biosecurity measures such as prompt detection, isolation, and disinfection of tanks and equipment can prevent the spread of the disease and limit the loss of fish stock. In 2002, spring viraemia struck an ornamental koi farm in Kernersville, North Carolina, and required complete depopulation of the ponds and a lengthy quarantine period. For a while after this, some koi farmers in neighboring states stopped importing fish for fear of infecting their own stocks.

Breeding 

When koi naturally breed on their own they tend to spawn in the spring and summer seasons. The male will start following the female, swimming right behind her and nudging her. After the female koi releases her eggs they sink to the bottom of the pond and stay there. A sticky outer shell around the egg helps keep it in place so it does not float around. Although the female can produce many spawns, many of the fry do not survive due to being eaten by others. On average if the egg survives around 4–7 days the fry will be hatched from the egg.

Like most fish, koi reproduce through spawning in which a female lays a vast number of eggs and one or more males fertilize them. Nurturing the resulting offspring (referred to as "fry") is a tricky and tedious job, usually done only by professionals. Although a koi breeder may carefully select the parents they wish based on their desired characteristics, the resulting fry nonetheless exhibit a wide range of color and quality.

Koi produce thousands of offspring from a single spawning. However, unlike cattle, purebred dogs, or more relevantly, goldfish, the large majority of these offspring, even from the best champion-grade koi, are not acceptable as nishikigoi (they have no interesting colors) or may even be genetically defective. These unacceptable offspring are culled at various stages of development based on the breeder's expert eye and closely guarded trade techniques. Culled fry are usually destroyed or used as feeder fish (mostly used for feeding arowana due to the belief that it will enhance its color), while older culls, within their first year between 3 and 6 inches long (also called tosai), are often sold as lower-grade, pond-quality koi.

The semi-randomized result of the koi's reproductive process has both advantages and disadvantages for the breeder. While it requires diligent oversight to narrow down the favorable result that the breeder wants, it also makes possible the development of new varieties of koi within relatively few generations.

In the wild 

Koi have been accidentally or deliberately released into the wild in every continent except Antarctica. They quickly revert to the natural coloration of an Amur carp within a few generations. In many areas, they are considered an invasive species and a pest. In the states of Queensland and New South Wales in Australia, they are considered noxious fish. 

Koi greatly increase the turbidity of the water because they are constantly stirring up the substrate. This makes waterways unattractive, reduces the abundance of aquatic plants, and can render the water unsuitable for swimming or drinking, even by livestock. In some countries, koi have caused so much damage to waterways that vast amounts of money and effort have been spent trying to eradicate them, largely unsuccessfully.

In many areas of North America, koi are introduced into the artificial "water hazards" and ponds on golf courses to keep water-borne insect larvae under control through predation.

In common culture

In Japan, the koi is a symbol of luck, prosperity, and good fortune, and also of perseverance in the face of adversity. Ornamental koi are symbolic of Japanese culture and are closely associated with the country's national identity. The custom of koinobori (carp streamers), which began in the Edo period (1603-1867), is still practiced today and displayed in gardens on Children's Day, May 5.

In Chinese culture, the koi represents fame, family harmony, and wealth. It is a feng shui favorite, symbolizing abundance as well as perseverance and strength, and has a mythical potential to transform into a dragon. Since the late 20th century, the keeping of koi in outdoor water gardens has become popular among the more affluent Chinese. Koi ponds are found in Chinese communities around the world, and the number of people who keep koi imported from Niigata, has been increasing. In addition, there are increasing numbers of Japanese koi bred in China that are sold domestically and exported to foreign countries.

Koi are also popular in many countries in the equatorial region, where outdoor water gardens are popular. In Sri Lanka, interior courtyards most often have one or several fish ponds dedicated to koi.

See also 
 Culture of Japan
 Japanese aesthetics
 Japanese white crucian carp

References 

History of Koi Fish

Further reading

External links 

 Feature article on treating sick fish, especially koi, "Surgery to Scale," Cosmos Magazine
 Koi in the NIWA Atlas

Carp
Fish of Japan
Articles containing video clips